Unstable is the second album by nu metal quartet Tetrarch. It is their debut recording for Napalm Records.

Composition
Musically, Unstable is a nu metal work, with both the album and Tetrarch credited with playing into the genre's revival. Elements of metalcore also appear, from the "intense" riffs on "I'm Not Right" to "Addicted"s "pure anthemia".

Critical reception

Upon its release, Unstable received generally positive reviews from music critics.

Track listing

Personnel
Adapted from AllMusic.

Tetrarch
 Joshua Fore - lead vocals, rhythm guitar
 Diamond Rowe - lead guitar
 Ryan Lerner - bass
 Ruben Limas - drums

Technical
 Dave Otero - production, engineering, mixing, mastering
 Joshua Fore - production 
 Diamond Rowe - production

Artwork and design
 Alan Ashcraft - artwork

References

2021 albums
Tetrarch (band) albums
Napalm Records albums